The Capstan and Bowstring is a mechanism that converts rotary motion into linear motion and vice versa. It is very similar in function to a rack and pinion but operates on a different principle, being that of the pole lathe. It consists of a capstan which is a reel or pulley around which the bowstring is wound several turns. As the capstan is rotated, the bowstring is pulled in on one side and reeled out on the other. The free ends of the bowstring are coupled to the linear part of the mechanism, the "bow", which holds the string in tension.

Such mechanisms are not often found since the rack and pinion is generally more robust for the same job. However the capstan and bowstring is easily fabricated by the home builder from scratch, where accurate rack and pinion mechanisms are not, and also require much looser tolerances between the working parts. The angle between the capstan shaft and the linear element can also be variable without any special couplings needed, such as universal joints. The cable is typically steel and can be tensioned at the points where it is connected to the bow. Another feature of the capstan and bowstring is that it can be designed to slip at the ends of its travel if desired by the simple expedient of having the cable slip around the capstan, forming a simple torque-limiting clutch. Capstan and bowstring mechanisms can be used wherever a rack and pinion or other rotary-to-linear conversion is found, such as in the steering mechanism of vehicles, etc.

The slip torque of the capstan can be set to any desired torque by adjusting the tension on the cable according to the capstan equation.

External links

Automotive steering technologies